Raina Assembly constituency is an assembly constituency in Purba Bardhaman district in the Indian state of West Bengal. It is reserved for scheduled castes.

Overview
As per orders of the Delimitation Commission, No. 261 Raina (SC) assembly constituency covers Raina II community development block and Hijalna, Natu, Palsona, Sehara, Narugram, Shyamsundar, and Rayna gram panchayats of Raina I community development block.

Raina assembly segment was earlier part of Burdwan (Lok Sabha constituency). As per orders of Delimitation Commission it is part of No. 38 Bardhaman Purba (Lok Sabha constituency).

Members of Legislative Assembly

Election results

2021

2016

2011

.# Swing calculated on Congress+Trinamool Congress vote percentages taken together in 2006.

1977-2006
Swapan Samanta of CPI(M) won the Raina assembly seat in 2006 defeating his nearest rival Nityananda Tah of Trinamool Congress. Contests in most years were multi cornered but only winners and runners are being mentioned. In 2001 and 1996, Shyamaprosad Pal of CPI(M) defeated Arup Kumar Das of Trinamool Congress and Arabinda Bhattacharyya of Congress, in the respective years. In 1991, 1987 and 1982, Dhirendranath Chatterjee of CPI(M) defeated Sunil Das, Uday Sankar Sain and Sukumar Chattopadhyay, all of Congress, in the respective years. In 1977, Ram Narayan Goswami of CPI(M) defeated Ajit Krishna Bhattacharya of Congress.

1951-1972
Sukumar Chattopadhyay of Congress won the seat in 1972, and in 1971, it was won by Gokulananda Roy of CPI(M). Panchu Gopal Guha of CPI(M) won it in 1969, and Dasarathi Tah of PSP won it in 1967. Prabodh Kumar Guha of Congress won the seat in 1962. It was a double member seat in 1957 and 1951. In 1957, Dasarathi Tah and Gobardhan Pakray, both representing PSP, won the seats. In the first state assembly elections after independence in 1951, Dasarathi Tah and Mritunjoy Pramanik, both representing KMPP, won the Raina seats.

References

Politics of Paschim Bardhaman district
Assembly constituencies of West Bengal
Politics of Purba Bardhaman district